The Panthay Rebellion (1856–1873), also known as the Du Wenxiu Rebellion (Tu Wen-hsiu Rebellion), was a rebellion of the Muslim Hui people and other (Muslim as well as non-Muslim) ethnic groups against the Manchu-led Qing dynasty in southwestern Yunnan Province, as part of a wave of Hui-led multi-ethnic unrest.

The name "Panthay" is a Burmese word, which is said to be identical with the Shan word Pang hse. It was the name by which the Burmese called the Chinese Muslims who came with caravans to Burma from the Chinese province of Yunnan. The name was not used or known in Yunnan itself.

Causes

Discrimination by China's imperial administration against the Hui caused their rebellions.  Although some sources suggest that the Panthay Rebellion originated solely as a conflict between Han and Hui miners in 1853, Han-Hui tensions had existed for decades prior to the event including a three-day massacre of Hui by Han and Qing officials in 1845. Hui and Han were regarded and classified by Qing as two different ethnic groups, with Hui not regarded as an exclusively religious classification.

Volume 8 of the Encyclopedia of Religion and Ethics states that the Panthay Revolt by the Muslims was set off by racial antagonism and class warfare, rather than the mistaken assumption that it was all due to Islam and religion.

In 1856, a massacre of Muslims organized by a Qing Manchu official responsible for suppressing the revolt in the provincial capital of Kunming sparked a province-wide multi-ethnic insurgency. In Dali City in western Yunnan, an independent kingdom was established by Du Wenxiu (1823–1872) who was born in Yongchang to a Han Chinese family, which had converted to Islam.

The Manchu official who started the anti-Muslim massacre was Shuxing'a, who developed a deep hatred of Muslims after an incident where he was stripped naked and nearly lynched by a mob of Muslims. He ordered several Muslim rebels to be slowly sliced to death. Tariq Ali wrote about the real incident in one of his novels, claiming the Muslims who had nearly lynched Shuxing'a were not Hui Muslims but belonged to another ethnicity but nevertheless the Manchu official blamed all Muslims for the incident.

Rebel ideology
The revolt was not religious in nature, since the Muslims were joined by non-Muslim Shan and Kakhyen and other hill tribes. A British officer testified that the Muslims did not rebel for religious reasons, and that the Chinese were tolerant of different religions and were unlikely to have caused the revolt by interfering with the practising of Islam. In addition, loyalist Muslim forces helped Qing crush the rebel Muslims.

Du Wenxiu was not aiming his rebellion at Han, but was anti-Qing and wanted to destroy the Manchu government. During the revolt Hui from provinces which were not in rebellion, like Sichuan and Zhejiang, served as negotiators between rebel Hui and the Qing government. One of Du Wenxiu's banners said "Deprive the Manchu Qing of their Mandate to Rule", and he called on Han to assist Hui to overthrow the Manchu regime and drive them out of China. Du's forces led multiple non-Muslim forces, including Han Chinese, Li, Bai, and Hani. Du Wenxiu also called for unity between Muslim Hui and Han. He was quoted as saying "our army has three tasks: to drive out the Manchus, unite with the Chinese, and drive out traitors."

Du Wenxiu did not blame Han for the massacres of Hui, but blamed the tensions on the Manchu regime, saying that they were foreign to China and alienated the Chinese and other minorities.

Du Wenxiu also called for the complete expulsion of Manchus from all of China in order for China to once again come under Chinese rule.

Total war was waged against Manchu rule. Du Wenxiu refused to surrender, unlike the other rebel Muslim commander, Ma Rulong. This may have had something to do with the sects of Islam practiced among the rebels. The Gedimu Hanafi Sunni Muslims under Ma Rulong readily defected to Qing, while the Jahriyya Sufi Muslims did not surrender. Some of the Jahriyya rebels in the Panthay Rebellion like Ma Shenglin were related to the Dungan revolt Jahriyya leader Ma Hualong and maintained contact with them.

The rebellion started after massacres of Hui perpetrated by the Manchu authorities. Du used anti-Manchu rhetoric in his rebellion against the Qing, calling for Han to join the Hui to overthrow the Manchu Qing after 200 years of their rule. Du invited the fellow Hui Muslim leader Ma Rulong to join him in driving the Manchu Qing out and "recover China". For his war against Manchu "oppression", Du "became a Muslim hero", while Ma Rulong defected to the Qing. On multiple occasions Kunming was attacked and sacked by Du Wenxiu's forces. His capital was Dali. The revolt ended in 1873. Du Wenxiu is regarded as a hero by the present day government of China.

Du Wenxiu wore Chinese clothing, and mandated the use of the Arabic language in his regime. Du also banned pork. Ma Rulong also banned pork in areas under his control after he surrendered and joined the Qing forces.

In Kunming, there was a slaughter of 3,000 Muslims on the instigation of the judicial commissioner, who was a Manchu, in 1856. De Wenxiu was of Han Chinese origin despite being a Muslim and he led both Hui Muslims and Han Chinese in his civil and military bureaucracy. Du Wenxiu was fought against by another Muslim leader, the defector to the Qing Ma Rulong. The Muslim scholar Ma Dexin, who said that Neo-Confucianism was reconcilable with Islam, approved of Ma Rulong defecting to the Qing and he also assisted other Muslims in defecting.

Tribal pagan animism, Confucianism, and Islam were all legalized and "honoured" with a "Chinese-style bureaucracy" in Du Wenxiu's Sultanate. A third of the Sultanate's military posts were filled with Han Chinese, who also filled the majority of civil posts.

Revolution slogans of Du Wenxiu

Negotiations
Peace negotiations were held by Zhejiang and Sichuan Hui Muslims who were invited by the Qing to Yunnan in 1858 and they were not involved in the revolt.

Course of the war

The rebellion started as widespread local uprisings in virtually every region of the province. It was the rebels in western Yunnan under the leadership of Du Wenxiu who, by gaining control of Dali in 1856 (which they retained until its fall in 1872), became the major military and political center of opposition to the Qing government. They turned their fury on the local mandarins and ended up challenging the central government in Beijing.

The Imperial government was hindered by a profusion of problems in various parts of the sprawling empire, the Taiping rebellion being one of them. It was a time when China was still suffering from the shocks caused by the first series of unequal treaties, such as the Treaty of Nanking. These circumstances favored the ascendancy of the Muslims in Yunnan.

The "Pacified" Southern Kingdom
The rebels captured the city of Dali, which became the base for their operations, and they declared themselves a separate political entity from China. The rebels identified their nation as Pingnan Guo (Ping-nan Kuo); their leader Sulayman ibn `Abd ar-Rahman, known as Du Wenxiu [originally Yang Xiu (杨秀)] (died 1873) was styled Qa´id Jami al-Muslimin ('Leader of the Community of Muslims', but usually referred to in foreign sources as Sultan) and ruled 185626December 1872.
Starting from 1855 the Hui of Yunnan had risen against the oppression to which they were subjected by the mandarins. They rose against the tyranny and extortion universally practiced by this official class, from which they were excluded. The mandarins had secretly hounded mobs on to the rich Panthays, provoked anti-Hui riots and instigated destruction of their mosques. The revolt was not religious in nature, since the Muslims were joined by non-Muslim Shan and Kachin people and other hill tribes in the revolt. A British officer testified that the Muslims did not rebel for religious reasons and that the Chinese were tolerant of different religions and were unlikely to have caused the revolt by interfering with the practicing of Islam.  In addition, loyalist Muslim forces helped Qing crush the rebel Muslims.

The rebellion started as a local uprising. It was sparked off by the Panthay laborers of the silver mines of Lin'an village in Yunnan who rose up against the Qing. The Chinese Governor of Yunnan sent an urgent appeal to the central government in Beijing. The Imperial Government was handicapped by problems that cropped up in profusion in various parts of the sprawling empire.

They repulsed the desultory attacks of the imperial troops. They wrested one important city after another from the hands of the imperial mandarins. The Chinese towns and villages that resisted were pillaged, and the male populations there were massacred. All the places that yielded were spared. The ancient holy city of Dali fell to the Panthays in 1857. With the capture of Dali, Muslim supremacy became an established fact in Yunnan.

Du Wenxiu was originally not aiming his rebellion at Han, but was anti-Qing and wanted to destroy the Manchu government. During the revolt Hui from provinces which were not in rebellion, like Sichuan and Zhejiang, served as negotiators between rebel Hui and the Qing government. One of Du Wenxiu's banners said "Deprive the Manchu Qing of their Mandate to Rule" (革命滿清), and he called on Han to assist Hui to overthrow the Manchu regime and drive them out of China. Du's forces led multiple non-Muslim forces, including Han-Chinese, Li, Bai, and Hani. Du Wenxiu also called for unity between Muslim Hui and Han. He was quoted as saying "our army has three tasks: to drive out the Manchus, unite with the Chinese, and drive out traitors." Du Wenxiu did not blame Han, but blamed the tensions on the Manchu regime, saying that they were foreign to China and alienated the Chinese and other minorities. Du Wenxiu also called for the complete expulsion of Manchus from all of China in order for China to once again come under Chinese rule. Total war was waged against Manchu rule. Du Wenxiu refused to surrender, unlike the other rebel Muslim commander, Ma Rulong. This may have had something to do with the sects of Islam practiced among the rebels. The Gedimu Hanafi Sunni Muslims under Ma Rulong readily defected to Qing, while the Jahriyya Sufi Muslims did not surrender. Some of the Jahriyya rebels in the Panthay Rebellion like Ma Shenglin were related to the Dungan revolt Jahriyya leader Ma Hualong and maintained contact with them.

The "Islamic Kingdom of Yunnan" was proclaimed after the fall of Tali-fu (Dali City). Du Wenxiu, leader of the Panthays, assumed the regnal title of Sultan Suleiman and made Tali-fu his capital. In this way, the Sultanate, fashioned after those of' the Middle East, appeared in Yunnan. Panthay governorships were also created in a few important cities, such as Momein (Tengyueh), which were a few stages from the Burmese border town of Bhamo. The Panthays reached the highwater mark of their power and glory in 1860.

Upon taking power, Du Wenxiu proclaimed that "the Taiping will become our allies, we will help each other, and we will destroy our enemies with our combined efforts." indicating his intention to cooperate with the heterodox Christian Taiping Rebellion which sought to overthrow the Qing dynasty.

The eight years from 1860 to 1868 were the heyday of the Sultanate. The Panthays had either taken or destroyed forty towns and one hundred villages. During this period the Sultan Suleiman, on his way to Mecca as a pilgrim, visited Rangoon, presumably via the Kengtung route, and from there to Calcutta where he had a chance to see the power of the British in India.

Decline
The Sultanate's power declined after 1868. The Chinese Imperial government had succeeded in reinvigorating itself. By 1871 it was directing a campaign for the annihilation of the obdurate Hui Muslims of Yunnan. By degrees the Imperial government had tightened the cordon around the Sultanate. The Sultanate proved unstable as soon as the Imperial government made a regular and determined attack on it. Town after town fell under well-organized attacks from imperial troops. Dali itself was besieged by imperial forces. Sultan Sulayman (also spelt Suleiman) found himself caged in by the walls of his capital. Desperately looking for outside help, he turned to the British for military assistance. He realized that only British military intervention could have saved his Sultanate.

The Sultan had reasons for turning to the British. British authorities in India and British Burma had sent a mission led by Maj. Sladen to the town of Tengyue in present-day Yunnan (known as Momien in the Shan language) from May–July 1868. The Sladen mission had stayed seven weeks at Momien meeting with rebel officials. The main purpose of the mission was to revive the Ambassadorial Route between Bhamo and Yunnan and resuscitate border trade, which had almost ceased since 1855, mainly because of the Yunnan Muslims' rebellion.

Taking advantage of the friendly relations resulting from Sladen's visit, Sultan Sulayman, in his fight for the survival of the Pingnan Guo Sultanate, turned to the British Empire for formal recognition and military assistance. In 1872 he sent his adopted son Prince Hassan to England with a personal letter to Queen Victoria, via Burma, in an attempt to obtain official recognition of the Panthay Empire as an independent power. The Hassan Mission was accorded courtesy and hospitality in both British Burma and England. However, the British politely but firmly refused to intervene militarily in Yunnan against Peking. In any case the mission came too latewhile Hassan and his party were abroad, Dali was captured by Imperial troops in January 1873.

The Imperial government had waged an all-out war against the Sultanate with the help of French artillery experts. The ill-equipped rebels with no allies were no match for their modern equipment, trained personnel and numerical superiority. Thus, within two decades of its rise, the power of the Panthays in Yunnan fell. Seeing no escape and no mercy from his relentless foe, Sultan Sulayman tried to take his own life before the fall of Dali. However, before the opium he drank took full effect, he was beheaded by his enemies. Manchu troops then began a massacre of the rebels, killing thousands of civilians, sending severed ears along with the heads of their victims. His body is entombed in Xiadui outside of Dali. The Sultan's head was preserved in honey and dispatched to the Imperial Court in Peking as a trophy and a testimony to the decisive nature of the victory of the Imperial Manchu Qing over the Muslims of Yunnan.

One of the Muslim generals, Ma Rulong (Ma Julung), defected to the Qing side. He then helped the Qing forces crush his fellow Muslim rebels. He was called Marshal Ma by Europeans and acquired almost total control of Yunnan province.

In the 1860s, when Ma Rulong in central and west Yunnan, fought to crush the rebel presence to bring the area under Qing control, a great-uncle of Ma Shaowu Ma Shenglin defended Greater Donggou against Ma Rulong's army. Ma Shenglin was the religious head of the Jahriyya menhuan in Yunnan and a military leader. A mortar killed him during the battle in 1871.

Scattered remnants of the Pingnan Guo troops continued their resistance after the fall of Dali, but when Momien was next besieged and stormed by imperial troops in May 1873, their resistance broke completely. Gov. Ta-sa-kon was captured and executed by order of the Imperial government.

Aftermath

Atrocities
Though largely forgotten, the bloody rebellion caused the deaths of up to a million people in Yunnan. Many adherents to the Yunnanese Muslim cause were persecuted by the imperial Manchus. Wholesale massacres of Yunnanese Muslims followed. Many fled with their families across the Burmese border and took refuge in the Wa State where, about 1875, they set up the exclusively Hui town of Panglong.

For a period of perhaps ten to fifteen years following the collapse of the Panthay Rebellion, the province's Hui minority was widely discriminated against by the victorious Qing, especially in the western frontier districts contiguous with Burma. During these years the refugee Hui settled across the frontier within Burma gradually established themselves in their traditional callings – as merchants, caravaneers, miners, restaurateurs and (for those who chose or were forced to live beyond the law) as smugglers and mercenaries and became known in Burma as the Panthay.

At least 15 years after the collapse of the Panthay Rebellion, the original Panthay settlements in Burma had grown to include numbers of Shan and other hill peoples.

Panglong, a Chinese Muslim town in British Burma, was entirely destroyed by the Japanese invaders in the Japanese invasion of Burma. The Hui Muslim Ma Guanggui became the leader of the Hui Panglong self-defense guard created by Su who was sent by the Kuomintang government of the Republic of China to fight against the Japanese invasion of Panglong in 1942. The Japanese destroyed Panglong, burning it and driving out the over 200 Hui households out as refugees. Yunnan and Kokang received Hui refugees from Panglong driven out by the Japanese. One of Ma Guanggui's nephews was Ma Yeye, a son of Ma Guanghua and he narrated the history of Panglang included the Japanese attack. An account of the Japanese attack on the Hui in Panglong was written and published in 1998 by a Hui from Panglong called "Panglong Booklet". The Japanese attack in Burma caused the Hui Mu family to seek refuge in Panglong but they were driven out again to Yunnan from Panglong when the Japanese attacked Panglong.

Impact on Muslims
The Qing dynasty did not massacre Muslims who surrendered, in fact, Muslim General Ma Rulong, who surrendered and join the Qing campaign to crush the rebel Muslims, was promoted, and among Yunnan's military officers serving the Qing, he was the strongest.

The Qing armies left alone Muslims who did not revolt like in Yunnan's northeast prefecture of Zhaotong where there was a big Muslim population density after the war.

The use of Muslims in the Qing armies against the revolt was noted by Yang Zengxin.

The third reason is that at the time that Turkic Muslims were waging
rebellion in the early years of the Guangxu reign, the ‘five elite
divisions’ that governor general Liu Jintang led out of the Pass were
all Dungan troops [Hui dui 回队]. Back then, Dungan military
commanders such as Cui Wei and Hua Dacai were surrendered
troops who had been redeployed. These are undoubtedly cases of
pawns who went on to achieve great merit. When Cen Shuying was
in charge of military affairs in Yunnan, the Muslim troops and
generals that he used included many rebels, and it was because of
them that the Muslim rebellion in Yunnan was pacified. These are
examples to show that Muslim troops can be used effectively even
while Muslim uprisings are still in progress. What is more, since the
establishment of the Republic, Dungan have demonstrated not the
slightest hint of errant behaviour to suggest that they may prove to
be unreliable.

Impact on Burma
The rebellion had a significant negative impact on the Konbaung Dynasty. After ceding lower Burma to the British following the First Anglo-Burmese War, Burma lost access to vast tracts of rice-growing land. Not wishing to upset China, the Burmese kingdom agreed to refuse trade with the Pingnan Guo rebels in accordance with China's demands. Without the ability to import rice from China, Burma was forced to import rice from India. In addition, the Burmese economy had relied heavily on cotton exports to China, and suddenly lost access to the vast Chinese market. Many surviving Hui refugees escaped over the border to neighboring countries, Burma, Thailand and Laos, forming the basis of a minority Chinese Hui population in those nations.

See also 
 Third plague pandemic
 Panthay
 Islam in China
 Islam during the Qing Dynasty
 Yusuf Ma Dexin, a prominent Muslim scholar in Yunnan at the time of the rebellions
 Taiping Rebellion
 Nian Rebellion
 Miao Rebellion (1854–73)
 Nepalese-Tibetan War
 Dungan revolt (1862–1877)
 Punti–Hakka Clan Wars

References

Bibliography

 
 
 
 
 
 
 
 Forbes, Andrew ; Henley, David (2011). Traders of the Golden Triangle. Chiang Mai: Cognoscenti Books. ASIN: B006GMID5K
 9=(Original from Harvard University)
 
 
 
 
 
 
 

Essays, studies
 
Articles (in journals, magazines etc.)
 
 
 
   -->

External links

 WorldStatesmen: China

Rebellions in the Qing dynasty
19th-century rebellions
Military history of Yunnan
Islam in China
19th-century military history of China
1856 in China
Violence against indigenous peoples